Indian Veterinary Research Institute (IVRI) is located at Izatnagar, Bareilly in Uttar Pradesh state.  It is an advanced research facility in the field of veterinary medicine and allied branches.  It has regional campuses at Mukteshwar, Bangalore, Palampur, Pune, Kolkata and Srinagar.  Formerly known as Imperial Bacteriological Laboratory, it was renamed in 1925 as Imperial Veterinary Research Institute. The name of the institute was changed following independence to Indian Veterinary Research Institute.  Administrative control of the institute is currently under Indian Council of Agricultural Research (ICAR), New Delhi. The Ministry of Education, Govt. of India on the recommendation of University Grants Commission conferred the status of the Deemed to be University on 16 November 1983 under Section 3 of UGC Act 1956.
It has recently started its UG education in 2015 with 20 seats. The number of seats in ug is 40 in the year 2021.

Notable alumni
Kanneboyina Nagaraju, Professor; Founding Chair, School of Pharmacy and Pharmaceutical Sciences, Binghamton University

See also
 Veterinary Council of India
 Indian Council of Agricultural Research

References

External links

Indian Council of Agricultural Research
Veterinary research institutes
Research institutes in Uttar Pradesh
Veterinary medicine in India
1925 establishments in India
Education in Bareilly
Medical research institutes in India
Deemed universities in Uttar Pradesh